Rao Chattar Sal or Shatru Sal (r. 1632–1658) was one of the more prominent rulers of the Kingdom of Bundi. He built the temple of Keshavarao at Keshoraipatan and Chathra Mahal at Bundi. 

He became king of Bundi after his grandfather Rao Ratan Singh, as his father Gopinath died while Ratan Singh was still alive. He saw service with the Mughal forces as head of his Hada Rajput troop and was considered an integral part of Mughal army by Shah Jahan. Rao Chattar Sal was trusted by Dara Shikoh with governorship of Delhi, a rare privilege for a Hindu. He also served as a foster brother to the princess Jahanara, Shah Jahan's daughter, with whom he shared a close friendship.

He remained loyal to Shah Jahan and Dara Shikoh during the War of Succession against Aurangzeb, despite temptations and threats from the latter. Rao Chattar Sal died fighting as the head of his Hada Rajput troops in the Battle of Samugarh in 1658 along with his youngest son Bharat Singh. 

Chattar Sal had married a daughter of Dalpat Singh Rathore, son of Raja Udai Singh of Marwar. She was the mother of his eldest son, Rao Bhao (1658 – 1681), who succeeded his father to the throne of Bundi.

See also
Mewar

References

3.Tod's Rajasthan

Maharajas of Bundi
Mughal Empire people
1658 deaths
Year of birth unknown